Carl Keller (9 July 1893 – 17 June 1981) was a former Australian rules footballer who played with Carlton and Fitzroy in the Victorian Football League (VFL).

Notes

External links 

Carl Keller's profile at Blueseum

1893 births
1981 deaths
Carlton Football Club players
Fitzroy Football Club players
Preston Football Club (VFA) players
Australian rules footballers from Victoria (Australia)